Wee Choo Keong (born 26 June 1953) is a Malaysian politician. He was the Member of Parliament for Bukit Bintang from 1990 to 1995 and for Wangsa Maju from 2008 to 2013. Wee had been a member of the Democratic Action Party (DAP) before being expelled in 1998. He then went on to form the Malaysian Democratic Party (MDP) the same year. In 2008 he left the party to join the People's Justice Party (PKR) before becoming an Independent in 2010. Wee was appointed as Tourism Malaysia chairperson by the then ruling Barisan Nasional (BN) government on 17 June 2015.

Political career

Democratic Action Party
Wee started his political career as a member of the DAP contesting in 1986 general election and he was elected as member of parliament for the Bukit Bintang constituency (earlier was Kuala Lumpur Bandar before been renamed) in 1990 general election.

In 1993, an injunction was issued against Wee and two other defendants from "printing, circulating or publishing any allegation of impropriety about the companies" after a case was brought by MBf alleging the defendants "unlawfully conspired with each other with the predominant purpose of injuring the companies by unlawful means". MBf later applied to have the defendants (including Wee) held in contempt of court for failing to obey the injunction. The application succeeded against Wee and another of his co-defendants and Wee was eventually ordered to pay a RM7,000 fine on appeal. The injunction against Wee brought by MBf was set aside in 2007 with the Court of Appeal ruling "The injunction was too wide in its terms and almost oppressive". He later sought damages against MBf and AmBank (who had acquired MBf) for loss of income due his inability to be an MP and the damage to his professional standing as a lawyer.

Malaysian Democratic Party (MDP)
Wee was removed from the Bukit Bintang seat in 1995 after a controversial court case which nullified his re-election that year due to the fine he had received. He was ejected from the DAP in 1998 after being accused of damaging the party's image and went on to form the Malaysian Democratic Party (MDP). He later attempted to join Parti Keadilan Rakyat (PKR) but was rejected by the party who stated at the time they did not want renegades from DAP. Due to the ruling against him in the 1995 court case, he was unable to contest the 1999 election. He contested the 2004 elections but did not even receive enough votes to keep his deposit. 
Wee Choo Keong was later referred to by V.K. Lingam in the Lingam tape. After the video tape was made public in 2007, Wee stated he intended to file for judicial review of the 1995 decision. Later, he also lodged a report with Suhakam over the tape arguing it demonstrated his human rights had been infringed.

People's Justice Party (PKR)
Before the 2008 general election, although still a member of the MDP, he was invited to join the PKR under the de facto leadership of Anwar Ibrahim and contest the Wangsa Maju constituency which he later won with a slim majority of 150.

Independent
In May 2010, Wee left PKR to sit in Parliament as an independent, citing disappointment with the PKR-led state government in Selangor's handling of the Dengkil sand mining scandal and the influence of what he called "little Napoleons and trendy leftists" in the party. He did not recontest his seat in the 2013 general election.

Joining Warisan
Wee was reported that he will also make a return appearance with Warisan in GE15 contesting for Wangsa Maju under Warisan Banner.

Election results

 Initially, the Returning Officer had declared Wee Choo Keong as the elected representative for Bukit Bintang at the night of 25 April 1995. However, Lee Chong Meng filed his petition to nullify the election due to the fact that Wee had been convicted of the offence of contempt of Court and fined RM7,000, and hence disqualified to be a Member of Parliament under the provisions of Article 48(l)(e) of the Federal Constitution. Election was declared null and void. The Federal Court had made such a controversial decision to declare Lee Chong Meng as the rightful winner. The appeal was dismissed by the Court of Appeal. No by-election was held by the Election Commission of Malaysia.

 Wee has contested and won the Wangsa Maju seat under the ticket of PKR but left to be an Independent in 2010.

Honours
 :
 Crown of Kelantan Decoration (SMK) (1997)

References

External links
 Official blog

1953 births
Living people
People from Kelantan
Malaysian politicians of Chinese descent
Malaysian Buddhists
20th-century Malaysian lawyers
Malaysian political party founders
Independent politicians in Malaysia
Former People's Justice Party (Malaysia) politicians
Former Democratic Action Party (Malaysia) politicians
Malaysian Democratic Party politicians
Sabah Heritage Party politicians
Members of the Dewan Rakyat